"Believe What You Say" is a song written by Dorsey Burnette and Johnny Burnette and performed by Ricky Nelson. The song reached #4 on the Billboard Hot 100, #6 on the R&B chart, and #10 on the country chart in 1958.  The song appeared on his 1959 album, Ricky Sings Again.  The song also appeared on his 1970 album, In Concert at the Troubadour, 1969.

The Burnette brothers along with Joe Campbell sit on Nelson's home steps to get a meeting with him.  Their persistence and their work impressed Nelson, and he agreed to record the song.  This is the first recording that Nelson recorded with musicians James Burton, James Kirkland, Richie Frost, and Gene Garf.

Other versions
Billy Burnette released a version of the song in 1976.

References

1958 songs
1958 singles
Songs written by Dorsey Burnette
Songs written by Johnny Burnette
Ricky Nelson songs
Imperial Records singles